Purgatory is the third full-length album by the power metal/progressive metal band by Borealis. It was released in Europe on June 19, 2015, and in North America on July 24 by AFM Records in North America and Europe. It is a concept album based on a child trapped within purgatory.

Track listing

Personnel
Matt Marinelli – vocals, guitars
Sean Werlick – keyboards
Jamie Smith – bass guitar
Sean Dowell – drums, recording, mixing
Michael Briguglio – guitars

Session musicians 
Gina Mancini – backing vocals (3)
Sarah Dee – female vocals (2)
Sierra Fortune Harron – note (6)

Technical staff 
Thomas "PLEC" Johansson – mastering
Stan Decker – artwork, layout
Erica Scobie – photography

References

External links
 http://www.afm-records.de/news/en/1509_borealis_sign_with_afm_new_album_teaser_available.html

2015 albums